Mladen Devetak (born 12 March 1999) is a Serbian football defender who plays for Italian  club Viterbese, on loan from Palermo.

Club career

Vojvodina
Born in Novi Sad, Devetak passed Vojvodina youth school. He made an official debut for Vojvodina in the 37th fixture of the 2016–17 Serbian SuperLiga season, played on 21 May 2017 against Javor Ivanjica. In June 2017, Devetak signed his first professional contract, penning a four-year deal with the club.

Palermo and loan to Viterbese
On 5 August 2022, the newly-promoted Italian Serie B club Palermo announced the signing of Devetak on a three-year contract. He made six appearances with the Rosanero before being loaned out to Serie C club Viterbese on 4 January 2023.

International career
Devetak was a member of a U19 national team.

Career statistics

Honours
Vojvodina
Serbian Cup: 2019–20

References

External links
 
 
 
 

1999 births
Living people
Footballers from Novi Sad
Association football defenders
Serbian footballers
Serbia youth international footballers
Serbia under-21 international footballers
FK Vojvodina players
Palermo F.C. players
U.S. Viterbese 1908 players
Serbian SuperLiga players
Serbian First League players
Serie B players
Serie C players
Serbian expatriate footballers
Expatriate footballers in Italy
Serbian expatriate sportspeople in Italy